"Criminalization of politics" is a political buzzword in the United States used in the media, by commentators, bloggers as well as by defenders of high-ranking government officials who have been indicted or have faced criminal or ethical investigations.

Most recently, the term has been applied to proceedings against President George W. Bush's advisers and the Republican Party leadership in Congress, including Tom DeLay, Bill Frist, and Karl Rove (see Plame affair). The position of their defenders, who include Robert Novak, William Kristol and Rush Limbaugh, is that the accusations against these officials lack substance and Democratic partisans seek to weaken them for political reasons, perhaps to the point of retaking Congress in 2006.

The position of many Democrats is that the number of investigations is the result of a "culture of corruption" established by the Republicans in power, and that anyone who has broken laws or rules must face the consequences. The opponents also point out that some of the politicians denouncing the current pursuit of alleged Republican misconduct have in the past called for vigorous pursuit of alleged Democratic misconduct.

The phrase was previously used by supporters of President Bill Clinton in reference to legal action against members of his administration, including Henry Cisneros. During the Watergate scandal, supporters of Richard Nixon claimed that he was guilty of nothing more than "hard-ball politics."

See also
Rod Blagojevich
Eliot Spitzer

Sources
"Fox News Pushing “Criminalization of Politics” Talking Point" from ThinkProgress.org, 2005
"The Criminalization of Politics", Molly Ivins, 2000

Political mass media in the United States